The  singles Tournament at the 2007 Pattaya Women's Open took place between 5 February and 12 February on hard courts in Pattaya City, Thailand. Sybille Bammer won the title, defeating Gisela Dulko in the final.

Singles

Seeds
The seeded players are listed below. Players in bold are still in the competition. The players no longer in the tournament are listed with the round in which they exited.

Draw

Finals

Top half

Bottom half

Qualifying

Seeds
The seeded players are listed below. Players in bold have qualified. The players no longer in the tournament are listed with the round in which they exited.

The four qualifiers were:

 Noppawan Lertcheewakarn
 Andreja Klepač
 Tzipora Obziler
 Meng Yuan

Draw

Group 1

Group 2

Group 3

Group 4

References

External links
Main and Qualifying Draws

Singles
Pattaya Women's Open - Singles
 in women's tennis